Adela Constantia Mary Walsh ( Pankhurst; 19 June 1885 – 23 May 1961) was a British born suffragette who worked as a political organiser for the WSPU in Scotland. In 1914 she moved to Australia where she continued her activism and was co-founder of both the Communist Party of Australia and the Australia First Movement.

Early life
Pankhurst was born on 19 June 1885 in Manchester, England, into a politicised family: her father, Richard Pankhurst, was a socialist and candidate for Parliament, and her mother, Emmeline Pankhurst (née Goulden), and sisters, Sylvia and Christabel, were leaders of the British suffragette movement. Her mother was of Manx descent. Adela attended the all-woman Studley Horticultural College in Warwickshire, and Manchester High School for Girls.

UK
As a teenager, Adela became involved in the militant Women's Social and Political Union founded by her mother and sisters. In November 1909 she joined a protest that interrupted a talk by Winston Churchill at his constituency in Dundee. She was arrested along with Helen Archdale, Catherine Corbett and Maud Joachim. Adela had slapped a policeman who was trying to evict her from the building. Although Adela went on hunger strike there, she was not force-fed as prison governor and medical supervisor assessed her "heart's action as violent and laboured". 

Eagle House near Bath in Somerset had become an important refuge for suffragettes who had been released from prison. Mary Blathwayt's parents planted trees there between April 1909 and July 1911 to commemorate the achievements of suffragettes including Adela's mother and sister, Christabel as well as Annie Kenney, Charlotte Despard, Millicent Fawcett and Lady Lytton.
The trees were known as "Annie's Arboreatum" after Annie Kenney. There was also a "Pankhurst Pond" within the grounds. 

Adela was invited to Eagle House in 1909 and 1910. She planted a Himalayan Cedar on 3 July 1910. A plaque was made and her photograph was recorded again by Colonel Linley Blathwayt. 

Her mother's favourite was Christabel and the two of them took the Women's Social and Political Union as their own organisation. They fell out with many of their leading volunteers and supporters and this included Sylvia Pankhurst and Adela. Both of the latter believed in socialism whereas Emmeline and Christabel were pushing for the vote for middle-class women. Sylvia was ejected from the party and she set up her own splinter group in East London. Christabel is reported to have said to Sylvia "I would not care if you were multiplied by a hundred, but one of Adela is too many." Adela was given £20, a ticket to Australia and a letter introducing her to Vida Goldstein. Adela was among the first group of suffragettes to go on hunger strike when in prison. She was being targeted by the police, as a high-profile activist. Adela Pankhurst had been given a Hunger Strike Medal 'for Valour' by WSPU.

Australia
Adela emigrated to Australia in 1914 following estrangement from her family and frequent incarceration. Adela's experience of activism enabled her to be recruited during World War I as an organiser for the Women's Peace Army in Melbourne by Vida Goldstein. Pankhurst wrote a book called Put Up the Sword, penned a number of anti-war pamphlets, and addressed public meetings, speaking against war and conscription. In 1915, With Cecilia John from the Women's Peace Army, she toured Australia, establishing branches of the Women's Peace Army. In 1916 she traveled through New Zealand addressing large crowds, and again toured New South Wales and Queensland arguing the importance of feminist opposition to militarism. In August 1917, Pankhurst was arrested during a march against rising food prices in Melbourne, which had been part of a series of sometimes violent demonstrations, unusual for the time in that they were spearheaded by women. British suffragette Louie (Louisa) Cullen also now in Melbourne, was among the 5000+ who signed a petition to the Australian Prime Minister for her release. In September 1917, she married Tom Walsh of the Federated Seamen's Union of Australasia, with whom she had a son, Richard (born in 1918) and four daughters, Sylvia (born in 1920), Christian (born in 1921), Ursula (born in 1923) and Faith (born and died in 1926). Her husband had three daughters from his previous marriage. In 1920, Pankhurst became a founding member of the Communist Party of Australia, from which she was later expelled. 

She became disillusioned with communism and founded the anti-communist Australian Women's Guild of Empire in 1927. In 1941 Pankhurst became one of the founding members of the far-right nationalistic Australia First Movement. She visited Japan in 1939, and was arrested and interned in March 1942 for her advocacy of peace with Japan. She was released in October.

Tom Walsh died in 1943; afterwards, Pankhurst withdrew from public life. In 1960, she converted to Roman Catholicism. She died on 23 May 1961, and was buried according to Catholic rites.

Posthumous recognition
Her name and picture (and those of 58 other women's suffrage supporters) are on the plinth of the statue of Millicent Fawcett in Parliament Square, London, unveiled in 2018.

Pankhurst Crescent, in the Canberra suburb of Gilmore, is named in her honour.

See also 
History of feminism
List of suffragists and suffragettes
Women's suffrage in the United Kingdom

References

Further reading
 Verna Coleman Adela Pankhurst: The Wayward Suffragette 1885-1961 Melbourne University Press, 1996
 Joy Damousi, "The Enthusiasms of Adela Pankhurst Walsh", Australian Historical Studies, April 1993, pp. 422–436
 Anne Summers, "The Unwritten History of Adela Pankhurst Walsh", in Elizabeth Windschuttle (editor), Women, Class and History, Fontana / Collins, 1980, pp. 388–402
 Deborah Jordan, "Adela Pankhurst, Peace Negotiator: World War 1, Queensland", Outskirts, 2018, 39, pp. 1–20

External links
 
 Adela Constantia Pankhurst at Australian Dictionary of Biography
 
 Adela Pankhurst, Peace Negotiator: World War 1, Queensland in Outskirts

1885 births
1961 deaths
Converts to Roman Catholicism
Australian feminists
Australian people of Manx descent
British feminists
English emigrants to Australia
Feminism and history
Former Marxists
People educated at Manchester High School for Girls
People from Chorlton-on-Medlock
Australian anti-communists
Adela
Eagle House suffragettes
Women's Social and Political Union
19th-century Australian women
20th-century Australian women
Hunger Strike Medal recipients
Communist Party of Australia members
Catholic feminists
Australian Roman Catholics